Sandro Burki (born 16 September 1985) is a Swiss former professional footballer who played as a midfielder. He is the sporting director of FC Aarau.

Club career
Burki began his career with FC Zürich. Burki caught the attention of numerous clubs, eventually signing for FC Bayern Munich. However, the move was not successful, and was subsequently criticised by Swiss Football Association Technical Director Hansruedi Hasler claiming that "The examples of Philippe Senderos and Sandro Burki, who were both U17 European champions, show how important the choice of team is."

Returning within a year to the Swiss leagues, he played for BSC Young Boys, FC Wil and FC Vaduz before signing for FC Aarau, to whom he is contracted until 30 June 2011.

International career
Burki is a former youth international and was in the Swiss U-17 squad that won the 2002 U-17 European Championships.

He made his senior Switzerland international debut against Cyprus on 22 August 2008, after which he was linked in the press with a move to Celtic.

Honours 
 UEFA U-17 European Champion: 2002

References

External links
FC Aarau profile 

Kader – Sandro Burki Swiss Football League

1985 births
Living people
Swiss men's footballers
Association football midfielders
Switzerland international footballers
Switzerland youth international footballers
Swiss Super League players
FC Aarau players
FC Bayern Munich II players
FC Zürich players
FC Vaduz players
FC Wil players
BSC Young Boys players
Swiss expatriate footballers
Swiss expatriate sportspeople in Germany
Expatriate footballers in Germany
Swiss expatriate sportspeople in Liechtenstein
Expatriate footballers in Liechtenstein